is a temple of the Pure Land Sect of Buddhism in Nakameguro, Meguro, Tokyo, Japan.

In 1718, the 3rd year of the Kyōhō era, the 36th Buddhist monk of Zōjōji called  died. One of his disciples, built Yūtenji as his shrine and made him the founder.

Transport
5 minutes walk from Yūtenji railway station on the Tokyu Toyoko Line.

See also 
 For an explanation of terms concerning Japanese Buddhism, Japanese Buddhist art, and Japanese Buddhist temple architecture, see the Glossary of Japanese Buddhism.

External links
Yutenji home page

Buddhist temples in Tokyo
Pure Land Buddhism